Acheilognathus tonkinensis is a species of cyprinid fish in the subfamily Acheilognathinae. It is found in northern Vietnam, Laos, and southern China. It occurs in rivers and deposits its eggs inside freshwater mussels.

References

Acheilognathus
Freshwater fish of China
Fish of Laos
Fish of Vietnam
Taxa named by Léon Vaillant
Fish described in 1892